State Trunk Highway 31 (often called Highway 31, STH-31 or WIS 31) is a  state highway in Kenosha and Racine counties in the US state of Wisconsin that runs north–south as a suburban route passing Racine and Kenosha. With the exception of a  stretch between Four Mile Road and WIS 32 at the north end, WIS 31 is a multi-lane urban highway. An expansion of the remaining  was proposed by the Wisconsin Department of Transportation (WisDOT).

Route description
WIS 31 begins at the Illinois state line where it connects to Illinois Route 131 (IL 131), following Green Bay Road to its junction through Pleasant Prairie. The highway briefly passes through the northwestern part of Kenosha. WIS 50 and WIS 158 cross WIS 31 in Kenosha. In the Racine area, WIS 31 crosses WIS 11, WIS 20 and WIS 38, turning onto Ole Davidson Road in Caledonia. Green Bay Road, named after the historic route connecting Chicago with Milwaukee and Green Bay, has been upgraded to four-lane divided highway for the entire length. Ole Davidson Road has been upgraded to a divided highway from the split with North Green Bay Road to Four Mile Road.

Major intersections

See also

References

External links

031
Transportation in Kenosha County, Wisconsin
Transportation in Racine County, Wisconsin